Ignac Kavec (born February 20, 1953) is a former Yugoslav ice hockey player. He played for the Yugoslavia men's national ice hockey team at the 1976 Winter Olympics in Innsbruck.

References

1953 births
Living people
Ice hockey players at the 1976 Winter Olympics
Olympic ice hockey players of Yugoslavia
Sportspeople from Ljubljana
Slovenian ice hockey forwards
Yugoslav ice hockey forwards
HDD Olimpija Ljubljana players
KHL Medveščak Zagreb players